The Gieselau Canal, or Gieselaukanal in German, is a canal in the German state of Schleswig-Holstein. It is near Oldenbüttel and links the Kiel Canal with the River Eider. 

References

Canals in Germany
Transport in Schleswig-Holstein
Federal waterways in Germany
Canals opened in 1937
CGieselau
CGieselau